The English Churchman is a Protestant family newspaper published in England with a global readership. The newspaper is not an official organ of the Church of England, but is one of only three officially recognised church papers, alongside the Church Times and the Church of England Newspaper. The formal title of the newspaper is English Churchman and St James's Chronicle. 

The St James's Chronicle dates from 1761. The first edition of a newspaper under the name English Churchman was published on 5 January 1843.

Contrary to general ecclesiastical trends, the English Churchman began life as an Anglo-Catholic newspaper. It was 'set up for the express purpose of advocating Tractarian views' and ranked alongside the British Critic as one of the 'two great Tractarian organs'. 

In 1884, the paper was acquired by those in sympathy with the Church Association, thus coming into evangelical hands, where it has remained ever since. It has gained a reputation for being 'robustly Reformed and Protestant, Evangelical, as the Formularies of the Church of England teach' (i.e. the Thirty-Nine Articles, the Book of Common Prayer, and the ordinal).

As of 1 February 2021, the editor was a clergyman of the Church of Ireland.

The cover cost of English Churchman has risen from one penny per copy in the late nineteenth century to one pound at present. The newspaper was originally weekly, but since the 1970s has been published fortnightly. Most readers are subscribers who receive the newspaper by post, although the paper was historically available through newsagents.

References

External links

John Wilkes & The St James Chronicle - UK Parliament Living Heritage

Christian magazines
Publications established in 1843
1843 establishments in England